£2 may refer to:

Current currencies
British bimetallic £2, a coin in current circulation 
Gold £2 coin, an historical circulating coin and a modern commemorative or bullion coin
Falkland Islands £2 coin
Gibraltar £2 coin
Sudanese pound (LS 2 note)
Saint Helena £2 coin
Syrian pound (LS 2 coin)

Obsolete currencies
Canadian £2 note
New Brunswick pound (£2 bill)
Prince Edward Island pound (£2 note)